Puerto Rico Highway 148 (PR-148) is a short north–south road that connects from PR-5 to PR-167 in Naranjito, Puerto Rico.

Route description
The bypass goes through Comerío and Barrio Guadiana from PR-5 because PR-167 (between Bayamón and Naranjito) has many curves. Originally PR-148 also ran to west (from its junction with PR-5 and PR-826) to the former PR-147 near the downtown of Naranjito to improve the access from the east because PR-164 (like PR-167) has many curves in Barrio Nuevo area. Actually the former PR-147 and the east–west section of this route is now part of PR-5.

Major intersections

See also

 List of highways numbered 148

References

External links
 

148
Naranjito, Puerto Rico